Bicavernaria is a genus of moths belonging to the family Tortricidae.

Species
Bicavernaria henicodes Razowski, 1988

See also
List of Tortricidae genera

References

 , 2005: World Catalogue of Insects vol. 5 Tortricidae.
 , 1988, Acta zool. cracov. 31: 399.

External links
tortricidae.com

Euliini
Tortricidae genera